Bakharevo is a rural locality (a village) in Shemogodskoye Rural Settlement, Velikoustyugsky District, Vologda Oblast, Russia. The population was 136 as of 2002.

Geography 
Bakharevo is located 14 km southeast of Veliky Ustyug (the district's administrative centre) by road. Chyornaya is the nearest rural locality.

References 

Rural localities in Velikoustyugsky District